Maehwasan (Gangwon) in Wonju, Hoengseong, Gangwon-do.
 Battle of Maehwa-San
 Maehwasan (South Gyeongsang) in Hapcheon, Gyeongsangnam-do.